The 2012 Austrian Figure Skating Championships took place between 16 and 18 December 2011 at the Graz Liebenau in Graz. Skaters competed in the disciplines of men's singles, ladies' singles, pair skating, and ice dancing on the senior level. The results were used to choose the Austrian teams to the 2012 World Championships and the 2012 European Championships.

Results

Men

Ladies

Pairs

Ice dance

External links
 info at the EKL 
 2012 Austrian Championships results

Austrian Figure Skating Championships
2011 in figure skating
Figure Skating Championships